Patrick Clement Simmons [birth name: Patrick Clement Simoni] (November 29, 1908 – July 3, 1968) was a relief pitcher in Major League Baseball who played briefly for the Boston Red Sox during the  and  seasons. He was born in Watervliet, New York.
 
In a two-season career, Simmons posted a 0–2 record with 18 strikeouts and a 3.67 ERA in 33 appearances, including three starts, 75 hits allowed, two saves, and 76.0 innings of work.
 
Simmons died at the age of 59 in Albany, New York.

External links

 Retrosheet
 Pat's Record at Baseball Chronology

Boston Red Sox players
Major League Baseball pitchers
Baseball players from New York (state)
1908 births
1968 deaths
Nashville Vols players